LDH is an acronym which may refer to:

 Lai Đại Hàn
 IATA code for Lord Howe Island Airport, New South Wales, Australia
 Lactate dehydrogenase, an enzyme in a wide range of plants, animals and other organisms; is measured as part of the complete blood test
 Large Diameter Hose, a type of fire hose
 Layered double hydroxides, a class of layered materials composed of positively charged atomic layers and charge balancing anions located in the interlayer region
 Letters Digits Hyphen rule in RFCs defining DNS: RFC 1034, RFC 1035, RFC 1123, RFC 3696, RFC 5890
 Human Rights League (France)
 LDH (company), Japanese entertainment company